Samlino  (German: Zemlin) is a village in the administrative district of Gmina Golczewo, within Kamień County, West Pomeranian Voivodeship, in north-western Poland. 

References

Samlino